Malaysia–Mexico relations are the bilateral relations between Malaysia and Mexico. Both nations are mutual members of the Asia-Pacific Economic Cooperation.

History 
In August 1966, diplomats from Malaysia and Mexico met in Washington, D.C., United States to discuss the possibility of establishing diplomatic relations. On 27 March 1974 diplomatic relations were formally established between the two nations. In the beginning, neither nation had a resident diplomatic mission. Mexico was accredited to Malaysia from its embassy in Jakarta, Indonesia while Malaysia was accredited to Mexico from its embassy in Washington, D.C. In 1985, Mexico opened an honorary consulate in Kuala Lumpur. In October 1985, after the coronation of King Iskandar of Johor; both nations commenced discussion of opening resident diplomatic missions in each other's capitals, respectively. In October 1991, Mexico opened an embassy in Kuala Lumpur. In 1992, Malaysia opened an embassy in Mexico City.

In September 1991, Prime Minister Mahathir Mohamad paid an official visit to Mexico becoming the first Malaysian head-of-state to visit Mexico. During his visit to Mexico, several agreements were signed between both nations, in particular Malaysia's support for Mexico to join the Asian-Pacific Economic Cooperation. In November 1998, Mexican President Ernesto Zedillo paid a visit to Malaysia to attend the 10th APEC summit being held in Kuala Lumpur. In October 2002, Deputy Prime Minister Abdullah Ahmad Badawi paid a visit to Los Cabos, Mexico to participate in the 14th APEC Summit.

In 2014, both nations celebrated 40 years of diplomatic relations. Both nations have worked closely as founding members of the Trans-Pacific Partnership.

High-level visits
High-level visits from Malaysia to Mexico
 Prime Minister Mahathir Mohamad (1991)
 Deputy Prime Minister Abdullah Ahmad Badawi (2002)

High-level visits from Mexico to Malaysia
 President Ernesto Zedillo (1998)
 Foreign Undersecretary Lourdes Aranda (2009)
 Foreign Minister Patricia Espinosa Cantellano (2010)
 Foreign Undersecretary Carlos de Icaza (2016)

Bilateral agreements
Both nations have signed several bilateral agreements such as an Agreement on a joint co-operation between Malaysian and Mexican companies to refine palm oil (1991); Agreement on Air Transportation (1992); Agreement on Credit and Reciprocal Payments between the Bank Negara Malaysia and Bank of Mexico (1991); Memorandum of Understanding in Telecommunications Cooperation (1994) and a Memorandum of Understanding in Agricultural Cooperation (1994).

Trade relations 
In 2018, two-way trade between both nations amounted to US$9 billion. Malaysia's main exports to Mexico include: integrated electronic circuits, telephones and computers. Mexico's main exports to Malaysia include: telephones; automobiles for touristic purposes; manufactured iron and steel. Mexican multinational companies such as Cemex and Gruma operate in Malaysia. There are 22 Malaysian companies that operate in Mexico.

Malaysia is one of the major import partners for Mexico, and since 1992 both countries have become partners on trade relations. Mexico was engaged in many types of business with Malaysia, especially on education and Malaysia had plans to engage in more business with Mexico under the Trans-Pacific Partnership (TPP).

Resident diplomatic missions 
 Malaysia has an embassy in Mexico City.
 Mexico has an embassy in Kuala Lumpur.

References 

 
Mexico
Bilateral relations of Mexico